Verona Walk is a census-designated place (CDP) in Collier County, Florida, United States. The population was 1,782 at the 2010 census. It is part of the Naples–Marco Island Metropolitan Statistical Area.

Geography
It is bordered to the west by Lely Resort. Collier Boulevard forms the western edge of the CDP.

Demographics

2020 census

As of the 2020 United States census, there were 2,713 people, 1,302 households, and 944 families residing in the CDP.

References

Census-designated places in Collier County, Florida
Census-designated places in Florida